China's Next Top Model Cycle 5 is the fifth cycle of the Chinese reality TV series, based on the international version and spin-off to the original, America's Next Top Model. It began to air on 21 May 2015 at 9:20 pm (UTC+8). This was the first season of the show to feature male contestants. The hosts were Chinese female supermodel Lynn Hung and Chinese male supermodel Zhang Liang.

The cycle featured 16 contestants competing for several prizes, including a modelling contract with Paras Talent Management and an editorial in Vogue China & GQ China.

The international destination for the show was London, with the rest of the filming taking place in Shanghai.

The winner of the competition was 22-year-old Li Si Jia from Harbin.

Contestants
(ages stated are at start of contest)

Episode summaries

Episode 1
First aired: May 21, 2015

Thirty semi-finalists arrived and their first challenge: a runway show for Moschino. The male and female models needed to pair up and walk together. The judges thought that most of the models took it as a performance rather than a fashion show and they were not happy about that. Sixteen semi-finalists were chosen for the next round but they were informed that only fourteen finalists would be picked. Afterwards, they had their first photo shoot. The models needed to bring out their personality in the shoot. Only a few of them were able to impress the judges to make the top fourteen and gain entrance into the model home.

First call-out: Li Si Jia	 
Bottom three: Jiang Ying, Lai Yu Ting & Wang Ren Chuan	
Eliminated: Jiang Ying & Lai Yu Ting

Episode 2
First aired: May 28, 2015

First call-out: Yi Chen	 
Bottom two: Ha Sheng & Wang Meng	
Eliminated: Ha Sheng

Episode 3
First aired: June 4, 2015

First call-out: Liu Xian Xia	
Bottom two: Jia Zhen Zhen & Xu Meng Ting	 
Eliminated: Xu Meng Ting

Episode 4
First aired: June 11, 2015

First call-out: 	Li Si Jia
Bottom two: Jia Zhen Zhen & Yu Ling Yun   
Eliminated: Jia Zhen Zhen

Episode 5
First aired: June 18, 2015

First call-out: 	Li Hao Ting
Bottom three: Liu Xian Xia, Yu Ling Yun & Wang Meng
Eliminated: Yu Ling Yun & Wang Meng

Episode 6
First aired: June 25, 2015

First call-out: 	Zhao Zhuo Nun
Bottom two:   Teng Tian Long & Li Hao Ting
Eliminated: Teng Tian Long

Episode 7
First aired: July 2, 2015
First call-out: 	Liu Xian Xia
Bottom three: Li Si Jia, Li Xue & Yi Chen  
Eliminated: Yi Chen

Episode 8
First aired: July 9, 2015
	
First call-out: 	Li Si Jia	
Bottom two:   Wang Ren Chuan & Zhao Zhuo Nun	
Eliminated: Zhao Zhuo Nun

Episode 9
First aired: July 16, 2015
	
First call-out: Li Si Jia		
Bottom two: Huang Si Qi & Wang Ren Chuan   	
Eliminated: Huang Si Qi
Special guest: Michael Cinco

Episode 10
First aired: July 23, 2015
	
First call-out: 	Li Xue
Bottom two: Li Hao Ting & Liu Xian Xia
Eliminated: Li Hao Ting
Featured photographer: Dean Lee
Special guest: Chen Ran

Episode 11
First aired: July 30, 2015
	
First call-out: 	Li Xue
Bottom two: Liu Xian Xia & Wang Ren Chuan
Eliminated: Liu Xian Xia

Episode 12
First aired: August 6, 2015

Eliminated: Wang Ren Chuan		
Final two: Li Si Jia & Li Xue
China's Next Top Model: Li Si Jia

Summaries

Call-out order

 The contestant was eliminated
 The contestant won the competition

Episodes 1 and 5 featured a double elimination with the bottom three contestants facing the danger of elimination.
In episode 7, Chen, Si Jia, and Xue landed in the bottom three. Si Jia and Xue were saved with a tied score of 33, while Chen was eliminated.

Scoring chart

 Indicates the contestant won the competition.
 Indicates the contestant had the highest score that week.
 Indicates the contestant was eliminated that week.
 Indicates the contestant was in the bottom two that week.

 Episodes 3, 4, 5, 8 and 11 had a special guest joining the panel for scoring. This means that the maximum total increased from 50 points to 60.

Photo shoot guide
Episode 1 photo shoot: Colorful editorial
Episode 2 photo shoot: Jungle wilderness in groups for Tusk
Episode 3 photo shoot: Beauty shots with flowers
Episode 4 photo shoot: Falling look-book for I'Am
Episode 5 photo shoot: Children's toys in groups
Episode 6 music video: "Are You Tide?" - Bad Kids
Episode 7 photo shoot: Suspended on polygons in metallic body paint
Episode 8 photo shoot: Terminator inspired futuristic shoot
Episode 9 photo shoot & fashion film: Waking up underwater; Michael Cinco collection 
Episode 10 photo shoot: On a yacht with Chen Ran for OK! girl China
Episode 11 photo shoot: Punk rock editorial
Episode 12 photo shoots: High end couture

Makeovers
Chen: Military shave
Hao Ting: Hair shaved on both sides 
Ling Yun: Buzzcut and dyed jewel blue
Meng: Short pixie and dyed blue-black
Meng Ting: Trimmed and lightened
Ren Chuan: Bleached platinum blonde
Si Jia: Hair shaved on one side and shortened
Si Qi: Bangs added, hair shortened and dyed pink
Tian Long: Shoulder length weave
Xian Xia: Lightened eyebrows and hair parted at the center
Xue: Dyed black with a natural wave
Zhen Zhen: Bangs shortened and weave added at the back
Zhuo Nun: Dyed dark brown

References

External links
Official website
Official weibo

2015 Chinese television seasons
China's Next Top Model